Ricardo Wong Kuoman (Chinese: 王国曼 Wáng guó màn) is a Peruvian politician. He is of Chinese Peruvian background. He was the And It's Called Peru's presidential candidate who unsuccessfully ran in the 2006 national election. He announced his withdrawal from the race due to lack of support, claiming unequal media coverage and opportunities, but retracted a few days later. Three days before the election, he announced that he dropped the race again and expressed his support for Alan García's candidacy, but there was no change in the official ballot. He received 0.086% of the vote and came in 19th place.

External links
Y se llama Perú's site

Living people
Candidates for President of Peru
And It's Called Peru politicians
Peruvian politicians of Chinese descent
Year of birth missing (living people)